GWB may refer to:

 Baylor University Golden Wave Band
 DeKalb County Airport (Indiana)
 The Geochemist's Workbench, a scientific modelling suite
 George Warren Brown School of Social Work of Washington University in St. Louis
 George Washington Bridge, linking Washington Heights, Manhattan to Fort Lee, New Jersey, United States
 George W. Bush (born 1946), 43rd president of the United States
 Gravitational wave background
 Great Western Bank (1907–present), an American bank
 gwb  ISO code  for the Gwa language
 Gypsum wall board, a.k.a. drywall, a construction material